The 1925 San Diego State Aztecs football team represented San Diego State Teachers College during the 1925 NCAA football season. San Diego State competed as an independent in 1925, after having been a member of the Southern California Junior College Conference (SCJCC) since they started playing in 1921. They became a member of the Southern California Intercollegiate Athletic Conference (SCIAC) in 1926.

The 1925 season was the first where San Diego State used the "Aztecs" nickname. The yearbook "Del Sudoeste" published at the end of the 1924–25 school year notes that January 6, 1925 was the date that "Berry, Schellbach and Osenburg christen college 'Aztecs' ".

The 1925 San Diego State team was led by head coach Charles E. Peterson in his fifth season as football coach of the Aztecs. They played home games at both Balboa Stadium and at a field on campus. The Aztecs finished the season with five wins, three losses and one tie (5–3–1). Overall, the team outscored its opponents 108–59 points for the season.

Schedule

Notes

References

San Diego State
San Diego State Aztecs football seasons
San Diego State Aztecs football